Dorothy Konopka (born April 6, 1986), better known by her stage name Kay Adams, is an American sportscaster and television personality. She hosted Good Morning Football on NFL Network from 2016 to 2022 along with People (the TV show!), a daily entertainment newsmagazine based on the magazine of the same name which aired from the fall of 2020 until the spring of 2022 over the stations of Meredith Corporation (merged with Gray Television in the fall of 2021).

She previously had several on-air hosting roles and also serves as the host of the DirecTV Fantasy Zone channel during football season.

Early life
Adams was born in Chicago on April 6, 1986.  Her parents were immigrants from Poland. She became interested in a media career while attending Whitney M. Young Magnet High School. At the University of Missouri, Adams majored in communications and worked various part time jobs to pay for her schooling, including bartender at a sports bar and radio personality on local country, top 40, and sports radio stations.

Career 
Early in her career, Adams served as an in-game host for the St. Louis Cardinals at their home games.

Adams’ first role with professional football was on fantasy football shows, including SiriusXM's Livin' the Fantasy and SiriusXM Fantasy Drive and DirecTV's NFL Sunday Ticket Fantasy Zone. She continues to host DirecTV Fantasy Zone. Adams was a guest on the October 17, 2012, edition of the Late Late Show with Craig Ferguson.

She has also worked for FanDuel and was a reporter for NBC Sports Network. While with NBCSN, she occasionally appeared as a guest on network shows such as The Crossover with Michelle Beadle, hosted by Michelle Beadle, and NBC SportsTalk.

From 2016 to 2022, Adams served as one of the hosts of NFL Network's Good Morning Football. The show is the network's year-round morning show Monday through Fridays. She has also served as a host for special events for the Chicago Bears.

On September 17, 2018, it was announced that Adams would be joining the DAZN boxing broadcast team hosting each fight night broadcast on the live and on-demand sports streaming platform, alongside Sugar Ray Leonard, Brian Kenny, Chris Mannix and LZ Granderson.

In 2020, Adams hosted a mobile version of Who Wants to be a Millionaire where the general public played for real money.

On September 5, 2022, FanDuel announced that Adams will be making her debut on FanDuel TV starting on September 6, 2022, with her show Up and Adams, which airs Monday-Friday at 11 a.m. ET.

References

External links
 

1986 births
American people of Polish descent
American sports radio personalities
American television sports anchors
Living people
NFL Network
People from Chicago
University of Missouri alumni